Judith Orloff is an American board-certified psychiatrist, self-claimed clairvoyant (psychic), and the author of five books.

Early life and education
Orloff was born in Philadelphia, Pennsylvania, daughter of Theodore and Maxine, both physicians. She grew up in Beverly Hills, where she later stated that she had experienced strong intuitions as a child. Her family includes many physicians. Orloff received her Doctor of Medicine (M.D.) degree from the University of Southern California in 1979. She completed a medical internship at Wadsworth Veteran's Hospital in Los Angeles in 1980, and held a psychiatric residency at the UCLA Neuropsychiatric Institute from 1979 to 1983.

Career
Orloff held staff positions at hospitals in the Los Angeles area (Cedars Sinai Medical Center, St Johns Medical Center, the Daniel Freeman Hospital, and Brotman Medical Center). She opened a private practice in Los Angeles in 1983. She has taken part in what she calls "intuitive research" projects with Thelma Moss, Mobius Group and the Institute of Noetic Sciences, and is a member of the American Psychiatric Association and the Southern California Psychiatric Society. Orloff is an assistant clinical professor of psychiatry at UCLA, and leads workshops on the relationships between medicine, intuition, and spirituality.

Orloff published her first book, Second Sight, in 1996. The Publishers Weekly review said "Orloff will appeal to open-minded readers." In her book, Orloff claims to have second sight, and uses the term energy psychiatry to describe her novel psychotherapy model. An updated edition was published by Three Rivers Press in 2010 with a revised subtitle: An intuitive psychiatrist tells her extraordinary story and shows you how to tap your inner wisdom. Orloff has written three more books; her 2009 Emotional Freedom is a New York Times bestseller that has been translated into 15 languages.

Orloff has spoken at medical schools, hospitals, the American Psychiatric Association, Fortune magazine's Most Powerful Women Summit; and at alternative and traditional health forums such as National Alliance for the Mentally Ill in Los Angeles, Columbia Presbyterian Hospital Medical Center in New York, the UCLA Pediatric Pain Program in Los Angeles, and the Maria Shriver's First Lady's Women's Conference also in Los Angeles. and she has a regular blog on The Huffington Post. and The Minds Journal.

Bibliography

The Empath's Survival Guide. Sounds True. 2017. ISBN 1683642112.

References

"Dr Judith Orloff". Unravel Brain Power. UnravelBrainPower.com.

External links

American motivational speakers
Women motivational speakers
American psychiatrists
American self-help writers
American spiritual writers
American women psychiatrists
Keck School of Medicine of USC alumni
Living people
University of California, Los Angeles alumni
Year of birth missing (living people)
21st-century American women